Steve Bays is a Canadian musician, audio engineer, and producer. He is a member of Canadian bands Hot Hot Heat, Fur Trade, and Mounties. Bays was also the frontman and one of the founding members of Hot Hot Heat.

Career

Bays has worked with a number of artists, either writing, recording, or producing, including The Zolas, Dear Rouge, We Are The City, The Killers, Diplo/Steve Aoki, Fitz and the Tantrums, Mounties, Born Ruffians, Mother Mother, Gay Nineties and Hawksley Workman.

Selected discography

References

Canadian songwriters
Canadian record producers
Canadian indie rock musicians